The 2001 Formula Volkswagen Germany supported by ZF Sachs was the inaugural season of the Formula Volkswagen Germany. All drivers competed in Volkswagen powered, Dunlop shod Reynard chassis.

Calendar and results

Final standings

References

2001 in German motorsport